The Tiffany Yellow Diamond is one of the largest yellow diamonds ever discovered. Its carat weight was originally 287.42 carats (57.484 g) in the rough when discovered in 1878 in the Kimberley mine in South Africa. It was cut into a cushion shape of 128.54 carats (25.108 g) with 82 facets—24 more than a traditional round brilliant—to maximize its brilliance. The facet pattern features eight needle-like facets pointing outward from the culet (bottom) facet. Jewelry and diamond historian Herbert Tillander refers to this as a "stellar brilliant cut", and lists the gem in his book, Diamond Cuts in Historic Jewelry – 1381 to 1910 (1995), among other such diamonds: the Cullinan Diamond, the Koh-i-Noor, the Polar Star, the Wittelsbach, and others.

The gem has been displayed across the United States. Its permanent home is at the Tiffany & Co. flagship store in Midtown Manhattan, New York City.

History
Discovered in South Africa in 1877, the stone was purchased by New York jeweler Charles Tiffany. His gemologist, George Frederick Kunz, studied the gem for a year before beginning to cut it; reducing it from 287 carats (57.5g) to its current size. The cutting was carried out in Paris. It was later mounted by Jean Schlumberger.

In 1879, the Tiffany branch in Paris obtained the Tiffany Diamond, which weighed 287.42 carats in the rough. It was the largest yellow diamond found up to that time. The task of supervising the cutting of this stone was the responsibility of one George Frederick Kunz (1856–1932), a twenty-three-year-old gemologist who had just joined the firm. Kunz modified the accepted square antique brilliant cut, bringing the total facets to ninety. The result is a cut that returns a great deal of light to the eye. Large diamonds of comparable brilliance were not fashioned until well into the 20th century. In 1893 it was part of Tiffany's exhibit at the Chicago World's Fair.

The gem was on loan from Tiffany & Co. to the Smithsonian National Museum of Natural History in Washington, D.C., from April 18, 2007, until September 23, 2007. At the time, Jeffrey E. Post, the museum's gem curator, said that this was the largest diamond on display in the U.S. The famous Hope Diamond is only 45.5 carats, which is about one-third the mass of the Tiffany Yellow Diamond.

The diamond is known to have been worn by only four women during its lifetime. It was worn by Mary Whitehouse at the 1957 Tiffany Ball held in Newport, Rhode Island, mounted for the occasion in a necklace of white diamonds. It was subsequently worn by Audrey Hepburn in 1961 publicity photographs for Breakfast at Tiffany's. In 2019, Lady Gaga wore the diamond at the 91st Academy Awards. Beyoncé wore the necklace in a collaboration campaign with Tiffany in 2021, becoming the first black woman to wear the yellow diamond.

In addition, Gal Gadot wore a replica of the diamond made by Tiffany & Co. in the 2022 film Death on the Nile, where the theft of the diamond is a part of the mystery.

See also
Golden Eye Diamond
Diamond color
Nassak Diamond
Red Cross Diamond
List of diamonds

Further reading
 Shipley, Robert M. (1938). Important Diamonds of the World, pp.  7. Gemological Institute of America, USA, Vol. 2, No. 11 (Fall 1938)

References

Yellow diamonds
Individual brooches
Diamonds originating in South Africa
Individual diamonds
Tiffany & Co.